Dulguun Enkhbat, also known as Enkhbatyn Dölgöön (born 27 March 1992) is a Mongolian basketball player for the Mongolian 3x3 national team.

Professional career 
Dulguun Enkhbat started his professional career in 2012.

Ulaanbaatar MMC Energy 
Dulguun Enkhbat has been a member of Ulaanbaatar MMC Energy team since 2017. He started to play at the FIBA 3X3 tournaments from Nanjing Challenger 2017 in April 2017 where team finished the tournament with 3rd place.   
In 2017, FIBA named Dulguun Enkhbat as one of the top 10 male 3x3 basketbal player of the year.

National team career
Dulguun Enkhbat represented for the Mongolian national basketball team at the 2013 Summer Universiade in Kazan, Russia and 2015 Summer Universiade in Gwangju, South Korea. He also named for the Mongolian national basketball team roster for FIBA Asia Cup 2025 Pre-Qualifier in November, 2022.  However, he didn't play due to hand injury.

3x3 National team career
Dulguun Enkhbat played with the Mongolia men's national 3x3 team at several FIBA 3x3 World Cup and FIBA Asia 3x3 Cup tournaments. In 2017, he won FIBA Asia 3x3 Cup defeating the New Zealand men's national 3x3 team in the final and named player of the tournament.

References

External links

1992 births
Living people
Guards (basketball)
Mongolian men's basketball players